Israel participated in the 1966 Asian Games held in Bangkok, Thailand from 9 December to 20 December 1966. Israel had previously been unable to complete during the 1962 Asian Games when the host country Indonesia, refused to permit the participation of Israel due to political reasons, stating it would cause issues with their relationship with the Arab states. Although Thailand allowed Israel to participate in 1966, several Arab nations boycotted and riots broke out during the games.

Medals

Athletics

Medal table

Women

Basketball

Preliminary round - group B

Standings

Games

Championship

Bracket

Semifinals

Gold medal game

Roster
Coach: Shimon Shelah
 Amnon Avidan
 Tanhum Cohen-Mintz
 Igal Dar
 Gershon Dekel
 Offer Eshed
 Abraham Gutt
 David Kaminsky
 Zvi Lubezki
 Itshak Shachar
 Ami Shelef
 Haim Starkman
 Ilan Zohar

Shooting

Medal table

Results

Swimming

Medal table

Men

Women

References

Nations at the 1966 Asian Games
1966
Asian Games